Ani Plaza Hotel, is a 4-star hotel at the central Kentron District of Yerevan, Armenia. It was opened in 1970 as a state-owned enterprise during the Soviet period. After the collapse of the USSR, Ani Hotel was privatized in 1998, and after a major renovation it was reopened as Ani Plaza Hotel in 1999. It is named after the medieval Armenian city of Ani, one of the historical capitals of the Armenian nation.

The hotel is located on 19 Sayat-Nova Avenue, at the intersection with Abovyan Street.

As of 2016, with 260 guestrooms, Ani Plaza is the largest hotel in Armenia.

History
During the 1960s, there were only 3 hotels  (Yerevan, Armenia and Sevan) serving the city of Yerevan. The state-governed Intourist agency was the regulating body of the hotels and tourism within the Soviet Union. A permission was granted from the central government in Moscow to build 4 new hotels in Yerevan through the efforts of Iliya Gevorgov, who was the director of the Intourist agency branch in the Armenian SSR.

The first of the 4 hotels to be constructed was the Ani Hotel. The newly opened Sayat-Nova Avenue was chosen as the site of the hotel. The design was composed by an architectural group included Eduard Safaryan, Phoenix Darbinyan and Felix Hakobyan. The trio had previously designed many of the residential buildings at the nearby Abovyan Street.

The construction of the hotel was launched in 1964 and completed by the end of 1969. The project was directed by Albert Sargsyan 1964-65), Victor Virabyan (1965-67) and Karlen Gharibyan (1967–69). In 1970, the hotel was officially opened at the 50th anniversary of the Sovietization of Armenia.

Following the commemoration of the 50th anniversary of the Armenian genocide in 1965, Armenian nationalism had a widespread revival among the young Armenians within the Soviet-ruled Armenia. Thus, the hotel was named after the ancient city of Ani (currently in Turkey), which served as the capital of the Bagratid Kingdom of Armenia between 961 and 1045. The royal emblem of the Bagratuni dynasty was placed at the entrance to the hotel.

At the time of its inauguration, Ani Hotel became the tallest building of the city, and the largest hotel in Yerevan. The total cost of the hotel summed 5 million roubles. Upon its opening, Ani Hotel was awarded a diploma by the Architects Union of the USSR as the best structure of 1970.

Ani Hotel hosted the FC Bayern Munich players during March 1975. In 1979, BB King stayed in the hotel along with his band, during his tour in the Soviet Union. The Russian jazz singer Larisa Dolina has performed several times in the hotel. In 1988, the hotel was acquired by the Ani Enterprises company headed by an American-Armenian businessman. In 1993, Cher stayed in Ani Hotel when she arrived in Armenia for her humanitarian mission, taking food and medical supplies to the war-torn nation.

Following the economical crisis of Armenia during the 1990s, the hotel was fully redeveloped in 1998. After large-scale renovation works, the hotel was reopened on 20 September 1999 as the 4-star Ani Plaza Hotel, with the presence of then-president Robert Kocharyan.

In 2015, "Ani Enterprises" was acquired by the Armenian businessman Genik Karapetyan.

Features
The ground floor of the hotel accommodates the "Snezhinka" café, the "La Folie" piano bar and restaurant, the "Ani" lounge bar, the "Garden Bar", an indoor swimming pool, and a health and spa centre. The mezzanine floor is home to 4 conference halls and the "Ani" restaurant (formerly "Urartu"). The 262 guestrooms of the hotel are within the remaining 12 floors.

Since 2006, Ani Plaza is among the regular venues that host the events of the Golden Apricot Yerevan International Film Festival.

The hotel can be reached via the nearby Yeritasardakan underground station.

References

Hotels established in 1970
Hotel buildings completed in 1970
Hotels in Yerevan